Vivekananda Institute of Professional Studies (VIPS) is in Pitampura, New Delhi, India. It is a private college, affiliated with Guru Gobind Singh Indraprastha University (GGSIPU). The college admits students in the different schools based on their performance in the IPU common entrance test for the respective course. Apart from the Common entrance test, the college also accepts CLAT and CAT scores for some of its courses.

History
The institute was established by S. C. Vats following a meeting he had with Swami Jitatmananda in 1997 who told him he should establish an institute of higher education in New Delhi in the name of Swami Vivekananda.

Admission Processes
Admissions at VIPS are on the basis on the merit of the candidate drawn on the basis of the Common Entrance Test (CET) conducted by GGSIPU. For all courses covered under CET, the university prepares a list of candidates in the order of merit in each category.

Recognition and accreditation
VIPS is approved by the All India Council for Technical Education (AICTE). It has been accredited by the National Assessment and Accreditation Council (NAAC) with an "A++" grade.

Its BCA course was ranked all India 15th and the BBA course was ranked All India 36th rank in the year 2021.

Schools
 Schools of Law and Education
 School of Information Technology 
 School of Business Studies
 School of Journalism and Mass Communication 
 School of Economics
 School of English Studies
College of Engineering

Programmes
The college offers the following courses:
B.Tech
 BBA
 BBA in Banking and Insurance
 B.A. (Hons) in Economics
 BA LLB
 B.Com (Hons)
 BCA
 BA in Journalism and Mass Communication
 LLM
 BBA LLB
 MCA
 BA (Hons) in English
 MBA
 PG Diploma in Management

References

Universities and colleges in Delhi
Colleges of the Guru Gobind Singh Indraprastha University
Journalism schools in India